Wellington Correctional Centre, an Australian maximum security prison for males and females, is located in Wellington, New South Wales, Australia,  west of Sydney. The facility is operated by Corrective Services NSW, an agency of the Department of Attorney General and Justice, of the Government of New South Wales. The Centre accepts sentenced and unsentenced felons under New South Wales and/or Commonwealth legislation.

The 2021 mouse plague caused the complete evacuation (420 inmates and 200 staff) of the facility in June 2021 as dead mice and damage to infrastructure led to concerns for health and safety of inmates and staff. Female prisoners were moved first, to Bathurst and Broken Hill.

See also

Punishment in Australia

References

External links
Wellington Correctional Centre website

Prisons in New South Wales
Maximum security prisons in Australia
Wellington, New South Wales